These are the results of the rhythmic individual all-around competition, the only Rhythmic Gymnastic event at the 1988 Summer Olympics.

Rules for the rhythmic gymnastics competition had changed after the previous Olympics. The ball apparatus was replaced by the rope. Thirty-nine gymnasts competed in the preliminary round, Each gymnast completed one exercise with each apparatus, and the twenty best gymnasts advanced to the finals. Each competitor carried over half her preliminary round score (prelim score) to the final, where it was added to her score in the final (final score). In the final, they again performed one exercise with each apparatus.

Each of the routines were judged by six judges, highest and lowest marks were dropped, and the average of the four remaining marks was the gymnast's score for the routine.

Preliminary round

Final

References

External links
 https://web.archive.org/web/20160811083328/http://www.gymnasticsresults.com/80/o1988rh.html

Women's floor
1988
1988 in women's gymnastics
Women's events at the 1988 Summer Olympics